Braden Hunt is an American voice actor who dubbed roles in Japanese anime for ADV Films.

Roles 

 The Mythical Detective Loki Ragnarok as Bandit 2 (ep. 8)
 Diamond Daydreams as Tezuka
 Full Metal Panic! as Shirai Satoru (ep 8)
 Gravion Zwei as Hans
 Hakugei: Legend of the Moby Dick as Shiro Tokisada
 Madlax as Chris Krana
 Misaki Chronicle as Male Cadet
 Peacemaker Kurogane as Souji Okita
 Saiyuki as Cho Hakkai
 Saiyuki Gaiden as Gensui Tenpou
 Sister Princess as Wataru Minakami
 This Ugly Yet Beautiful World as Takeru Takemoto
 Ushio and Tora as Construction Worker (ep 5), Friend (ep 7-8), Man in Crowd (ep 9), Villager (ep 9)

External links
 
 

American male voice actors
Living people
Year of birth missing (living people)
Place of birth missing (living people)